John Charles Spencer, 3rd Earl Spencer,  (30 May 1782 – 1 October 1845), styled Viscount Althorp from 1783 to 1834, was a British statesman. He was Chancellor of the Exchequer under Lord Grey and Lord Melbourne from 1830 to 1834. Due to his reputation for integrity, he was nicknamed "Honest Jack".

Early years
His father George Spencer, 2nd Earl Spencer had served in the ministries of Pitt the Younger, Charles James Fox and Lord Grenville, and was First Lord of the Admiralty (1794–1801). George Spencer was married to the eldest daughter of Lord Lucan. Their eldest son, John Charles, was born at Spencer House, London, on 30 May 1782. In 1800, after Harrow, he took up his residence at Trinity College, Cambridge, and for some time applied himself energetically to mathematical studies; but he spent most of his time in hunting and racing. He was appointed a deputy lieutenant of Northamptonshire on 5 June 1803.

In 1804, he entered parliament as a member for Okehampton in Devon. He vacated his seat in 1806, to contest the University of Cambridge against Lord Henry Petty and Lord Palmerston (when he was hopelessly beaten), but he was elected that same year for St Albans, and appointed a lord of the treasury. At the general election in November 1806, he was elected for Northamptonshire, and he continued to sit for the county until he succeeded to the peerage. For the next few years after this speech, Lord Althorp occasionally spoke in debates and was always on the side of Liberalism, but from 1813 to 1818 he was only rarely in the House of Commons. His absence was partly due to a feeling that it was hopeless to struggle against the will of the Tory ministry, but more particularly because of the death of his wife.

Leader of the Commons
In 1819, on his return to political life, he pressed for establishing a more efficient bankruptcy court, and of expediting the recovery of small debts; and he saw both these reforms accomplished before 1825. During the greater part of the reign of George IV, the Whigs lost their influence in the state from their want of cohesion, but this defect was soon remedied in 1830 when Lord Althorp was chosen their leader in the lower house, and his capacity for the position was proved by experience. In Lord Grey's government Althorp was both Leader of the House of Commons and Chancellor of the Exchequer. He was instrumental in the success of the government measures. Along with Lord John Russell, he led the fight to pass the Reform Bill of 1832, making more than twenty speeches, and is generally considered the architect of its victory.

The Lords
After the dissolution of 1833, the Whig government had been slowly dying, and was further weakened by Althorp's promotion to the House of Lords following the death of his father in 1834. The new Lord Spencer abandoned the cares of office and returned to country life with unalloyed delight. Henceforth agriculture, not politics, was his principal interest. He was the first president of the Royal Agricultural Society (founded 1838), and a notable cattle breeder. Though often urged by his political friends to come to their assistance, he rarely quit the peaceful pleasures which he loved. He died without issue at Wiseton on 1 October 1845, and was succeeded by his brother Frederick (d. 1857).

Reputation and legacy
The Whigs required, to carry the Reform Bill, a leader above party spirit. "Honest Jack Althorp" has been called "the most decent man who ever held high Government office". Although he was not a particularly good public speaker, his integrity was an invaluable asset to the Government. Henry Hardinge, 1st Viscount Hardinge said that one of John Wilson Croker's speeches was demolished by the simple statement of Lord Althorp that he "had collected some figures which entirely refuted it, but had lost them." To Croker's credit, he replied that he would never doubt Althorp's word.

Spencer Street in Melbourne, is named in his honour.

Marriage
On 13 April 1814, Spencer married Esther Acklom (September 1788 – 11 June 1818) at Upper Brook Street, Mayfair, London. Cokayne quotes from the Farington Diaries, "in marrying He complied with the wishes of Lord and Lady Spencer, it was not of His own seeking" and from the Letter Bag of Lady Elizabeth Spencer-Stanhope, "since Jack Althorp would not propose to her, she proposed to him; and such an unusual proceeding was fraught with happy consequences ... his devotion after marriage amply compensated for his lack of ardour before." Esther died on 11 June 1818 at the age of 29 at Halkin Street, Belgravia, London, England, in childbirth and she was buried on 18 June 1818 in Brington, Northamptonshire, England. John was said to be deeply upset by his wife's death and was devoted to her memory for the rest of his life: he resolved never to remarry, and it is said that he gave up hunting, his favourite pastime, to mark the depth of his loss.

Coat of arms

Ancestry

References

Bibliography
T.C. Banks (1837). The Dormant and Extinct Baronage of England, volume 4.
W.A. Bartlett (1865). The History and Antiquities of the Parish of Wimbledon, Surrey.
E. Brydges (1812). Collin's Peerage of England, volume 3.
A.P. Burke (1931). A Heraldic and Genealogical History of the Peerage.
J. Burke (1836). A Genealogical and Heraldic History of the Commoners of Great Britain and Ireland, volume 3.
C.E.H. Chadwyck-Healey (1901). The History of the Part of West Somerset Comprising the Parishes of Luccombe, Selworthy, Stoke Pero, Porlock, Culbone and Ore.
J. Burke and J.B. Burke (1841). A Genealogical and Heraldic History of the Extinct and Dormant Baronetcies of England, Ireland, and Scotland.
G.E. Cokayne (1892). Complete Peerage, 1st edition, volume 4. 
G.E. Cokayne (1893). Complete Peerage, 1st edition, volume 5.
G.E. Cokayne (1896). Complete Peerage, 1st edition, volume 7.
G.E. Cokayne (1902). Complete Baronetage, volume 2. 
F.W. Weaver and C.H. Mayo (eds.) (1895). Notes and Queries for Somerset and Dorset, volume 4.
G.E. Cokayne (1892). "Complete Peerage", volume 13. page 156.

Further reading
Myers, Ernest (1890) Lord Althorp. 240 p. London: R. Bentley
Wasson, Ellis Archer (1987) Whig Renaissance: Lord Althorp and the Whig Party 1782–1845. 439 p.; London: Garland.

External links

1782 births
1845 deaths
John Spencer, 3rd Earl Spencer
03
Chancellors of the Exchequer of the United Kingdom
People educated at Harrow School
Alumni of Trinity College, Cambridge
Members of the Parliament of the United Kingdom for Okehampton
UK MPs 1806–1807
UK MPs 1807–1812
UK MPs 1820–1826
UK MPs 1826–1830
UK MPs 1830–1831
UK MPs 1831–1832
UK MPs 1832–1835
Spencer, E3
Leaders of the House of Commons of the United Kingdom
Fellows of the Royal Society
Deputy Lieutenants of Northamptonshire
Members of the Privy Council of the United Kingdom
People from Wiseton
Whig (British political party) MPs for English constituencies
Committee members of the Society for the Diffusion of Useful Knowledge